Difluorides are chemical compounds with two fluorine atoms per molecule (or per formula unit).

Metal difluorides are all ionic. Despite being highly ionic, the alkali earth metal difluorides generally have extremely high lattice stability and are thus insoluble in water. One exception is beryllium difluoride. In addition, many transition metal difluorides are water-soluble.

Calcium difluoride is a notable compound.  In the form of the mineral fluorite it is the major source of commercial fluorine.  It also has an eponymic crystal structure, which is an end member of the spectrum starting from bixbyite and progressing through pyrochlore.

List of the difluorides

Examples of the difluorides include:

Alkaline earth metal difluorides 
The alkaline earth metals all exhibit the oxidation state +2, and form difluorides.  The difluoride of radium is however not well established due to the element's high radioactivity.
 Beryllium difluoride
 Magnesium fluoride
 Calcium fluoride
 Strontium difluoride
 Barium fluoride
 Radium fluoride

{| class="wikitable sortable"
|+ Solubility-related constants of alkaline earth metal fluorides
! Metal
! M2+ HE
! F− HE
! "MF2" unitHE
! MF2 latticeenergies (−kJ/mol) 
! Solubility(mol/L)
|-
| Be
| 2,455
| 458
| 3,371
| 3,526
| 25
|- 
| Mg
| 1,922
| 458
| 2,838
| 2,978
| 0.0012
|-
| Ca
| 1,577
| 458
| 2,493
| 2,651
| 0.0002
|-
| Sr
| 1,415
| 458
| 2,331
| 2,513
| 0.0008
|-
| Ba
| 1,361
| 458
| 2,277
| 2,373
| 0.006
|}

Lanthanide difluorides 
 Samarium difluoride
 Europium difluoride
 Ytterbium difluoride

Transition metal difluorides
Compounds of the form MF2:
Cadmium difluoride
Chromium(II) fluoride
Cobalt difluoride
Copper(II) fluoride
Iron(II) fluoride
Manganese(II) fluoride
Mercury difluoride
Nickel difluoride
Palladium difluoride
Silver difluoride
Zinc difluoride

Post-transition metal difluorides 
Lead difluoride
Tin(II) fluoride

Nonmetal and metalloid difluorides
Dinitrogen difluoride
Oxygen difluoride
Dioxygen difluoride
Selenoyl difluoride
Sulfur difluoride
Disulfur difluoride
Thionyl difluoride
Germanium difluoride

Noble gas difluorides 
Helium difluoride (hypothetical)
 Argon difluoride (predicted)
Krypton difluoride
Xenon difluoride
Radon difluoride

Bifluorides
The bifluorides contain the two fluorine atoms in a covalently bound HF2− polyatomic ion rather than as F− anions.
Ammonium bifluoride
Potassium bifluoride
Sodium bifluoride

Organic difluorides

Ethanedioyl difluoride
Ethylidene difluoride
Carbonyl difluoride
Carbon dibromide difluoride (dibromodifluoromethane)
Carbon dichloride difluoride (dichlorodifluormethane)
Methyl difluoride
Methylphosphonyl difluoride
Polyvinylidene difluoride

References

Bibliography

Fluorides